This is a list of cathedrals in Albania, sorted by Christian denomination.

Eastern Orthodox
Cathedrals of the Albanian Orthodox Church include:

Roman Catholic
Cathedrals of the Albanian Catholic Church include:

See also

 List of churches in Albania
 Christianity in Albania
 Lists of cathedrals by country
 List of Roman Catholic dioceses in Albania

References

External links

Albania
Cathedrals in Albania
Cathedrals
Cathedrals